Spiral Dynamics (SD) is a model of the evolutionary development of individuals, organizations, and societies. It was initially developed by Don Edward Beck and Christopher Cowan based on the emergent cyclical theory of Clare W. Graves, combined with memetics as proposed by Richard Dawkins and further developed by Mihaly Csikszentmihalyi. A later collaboration between Beck and Ken Wilber produced Spiral Dynamics Integral (SDi).  Several variations of Spiral Dynamics continue to exist, both independently and incorporated into or drawing on Wilber's Integral theory.  In addition to influencing both integral theory and metamodernism, Spiral Dynamics is noted for its applications in management theory and business ethics, and as an example of applied memetics.

Overview 

Spiral Dynamics describes how value systems and worldviews emerge from the interaction of "life conditions" and the mind's capacities.  The emphasis on life conditions as essential to the progression through value systems is unusual among similar theories, and leads to the view that no level is inherently positive or negative, but rather is a response to the local environment.  Through these value systems, groups and cultures structure their societies and individuals integrate within them. Each distinct set of values is developed as a response to solving the problems of the previous system. Changes between states may occur incrementally (first order change) or in a sudden breakthrough (second order change).  The value systems develop in a specific order, and the most important question when considering the value system being expressed in a particular behavior is why the behavior occurs.

Overview of the levels

Development of the theory 
University of North Texas (UNT) professor Don Beck sought out Union College psychology professor Clare W. Graves after reading about his work in The Futurist. They met in person in 1975, and Beck, soon joined by UNT faculty member Chris Cowan, worked closely with Graves until his death in 1986. Beck made over 60 trips to South Africa during the 1980s and 1990s, applying Graves's emergent cyclical theory in various projects.  This experience, along with others Beck and Cowan had applying the theory in North America, motivated the development of Spiral Dynamics.

Beck and Cowan first published their extension and adaptation of Graves's emergent cyclical theory in Spiral Dynamics: Mastering Values, Leadership, and Change (Exploring the New Science of Memetics) (1996). They introduced a simple color-coding for the eight value systems identified by Graves (and a predicted ninth) which is better known than Graves's letter pair identifiers. Additionally, Beck and Cowan integrated ideas from the field of memetics as created by Dawkins and further developed by Csikszentmihalyi, identifying memetic attractors for each of Graves's levels. These attractors, which they called "VMemes", are said to bind memes into cohesive packages which structure the world views of both individuals and societies.

Diversification of views 
While Spiral Dynamics began as a single formulation and extension of Graves's work, a series of disagreements and shifting collaborations have produced three distinct approaches. By 2010, these had settled as Christopher Cowan and Natasha Todorovic advocating their trademarked "SPIRAL DYNAMICS®" as fundamentally the same as Graves's emergent cyclical theory, Don Beck advocating Spiral Dynamics Integral (SDi) with a community of practice around various chapters of his Centers for Human Emergence, and Ken Wilber subordinating SDi to his similarly but-not-identically colored Integral AQAL "altitudes", with a greater focus on spirituality.

This state of affairs has led to practitioners noting the "lineage" of their approach in publications.

Timeline 
The following timeline shows the development of the various Spiral Dynamics factions and the major figures involved in them, as well as the initial work done by Graves. Splits and changes between factions are based on publications or public announcements, or approximated to the nearest year based on well-documented events.

Vertical bars indicate notable publications, which are listed along with a few other significant events after the timeline.

Bolded years indicate publications that appear as vertical bars in the chart above:

 1966: Graves: first major publication (in The Harvard Business review)
 1970: Graves: peer reviewed publication in Journal of Humanistic Psychology
 1974: Graves: article in The Futurist (Beck first becomes aware of Graves's theory; Cowan a bit later)
 1977: Graves abandons manuscript of what would later become The Never Ending Quest
 1979: Beck and Cowan found National Values Center, Inc. (NVC)
 1981: Beck and Cowan resign from UNT to work with Graves; Beck begins applying theory in South Africa
 1986: Death of Clare Graves
 1995: Wilber: Sex, Ecology, Spirituality (introduces quadrant model, first mention of Graves's ECLET)
 1996: Beck and Cowan: Spiral Dynamics: Mastering Values, Leadership, and Change
 1998: Cowan and Todorovic form NVC Consulting (NVCC) as an "outgrowth" of NVC
 1998: Cowan files for "Spiral Dynamics" service mark, registered to NVC
 1999: Beck (against SD as service mark) and Cowan (against Wilber's Integral theory) cease collaborating
 1999: Wilber: The Collected Works of Ken Wilber, Vol. 4: Integral Psychology (first Spiral Dynamics reference)
 2000: Cowan and Todorovic: "Spiral Dynamics: The Layers of Human Values in Strategy" in Strategy & Leadership (peer reviewed)
 2000: Wilber: A Theory of Everything (integrates SD with AQAL, defines MGM: "Mean Green Meme")
 2000: Wilber founds the Integral Institute with Beck as a founding associate around this time
 2002: Beck: "SDi: Spiral Dynamics in the Integral Age" (launches SDi as a brand)
 2002: Todorovic: "The Mean Green Hypothesis: Fact or Fiction?" (refutes MGM)
 2002: Graves; William R. Lee (annot.); Cowan and Todorovic (eds.): Levels of Human Existence, transcription of Graves's 1971 three-day seminar
 2004: Beck founds the Center for Human Emergence (CHE),
2005: Beck, Elza S. Maalouf and Said E. Dawlabani found the Center for Human Emergence Middle East 
 2005: Graves; Cowan and Todorovic (eds.): The Never Ending Quest
 2005: Beck and Wilber cease collaborating around this time, disagreeing on Wilber's changes to SDi
 2006: Wilber: Integral Spirituality (adds altitudes colored to align with both SDi and chakras)
 2009: NVC dissolved as business entity, original SD service mark (officially registered to NVC) canceled
 2010: Cowan and Todorovic re-file for SD service mark and trademark, registered to NVC Consulting
 2015: Death of Chris Cowan
 2017: Wilber: Religion of Tomorrow (further elaborates on the altitude concept and coloring)
 2018: Beck et al.: Spiral Dynamics in Action
 2022: Death of Don Beck

Cowan and Todorovic's "Spiral Dynamics" 

Chris Cowan's decision to trademark "Spiral Dynamics" in the US and form a consulting business with Natasha Todorovic contributed to the split between Beck and him in 1999.  Cowan and Todorovic subsequently published an article on Spiral Dynamics in the peer-reviewed journal Strategy & Leadership, edited and published Graves's unfinished manuscript, and generally took the position that the distinction between Spiral Dynamics and Graves's ECLET is primarily one of terminology. Holding this view, they opposed interpretations seen as "heterodox."

In particular, Cowan and Todorovic's view of Spiral Dynamics stands in opposition to that of Ken Wilber. Wilber biographer Frank Visser describes Cowan as a "strong" critic of Wilber and his Integral theory, particularly the concept of a "Mean Green Meme."  Todorovic produced a paper arguing that research refutes the existence of the "Mean Green Meme" as Beck and particularly Wilber described it.

Beck's "Spiral Dynamics integral" (SDi) 

By early 2000, Don Beck was corresponding with integral philosopher Ken Wilber about Spiral Dynamics and using a "4Q/8L" diagram combining Wilber's four quadrants with the eight known levels of Spiral Dynamics.  Beck officially announced SDi as launching on January 1, 2002, aligning Spiral Dynamics with integral theory and additionally citing the influence of John Petersen of the Arlington Institute and Ichak Adizes.  By 2006, Wilber had introduced a slightly different color sequence for his AQAL "altitudes", diverging from Beck's SDi and relegating it to the values line, which is one of many lines within AQAL.

Later influences on SDi include the work of Muzafer Sherif and Carolyn Sherif in the fields of realistic conflict and social judgement, specifically their Assimilation Contrast Effect model and Robber's Cave study

SD/SDi and Ken Wilber's Integral Theory 
Ken Wilber briefly referenced Graves in his 1986 book (with Jack Engler and Daniel P. Brown) Transformations of Consciousness, and again in 1995's Sex, Ecology, Spirituality which also introduced his four quadrants model.  However, it was not until the "Integral Psychology" section of 1999's Collected Works: Volume 4 that he integrated Gravesian theory, now in the form of Spiral Dynamics.  Beck and Wilber began discussing their ideas with each other around this time.

AQAL "altitudes" 

By 2006, Wilber was using SDi only for the values line, one of many lines in his All Quadrants, All Levels/Lines (AQAL) framework.  In the book Integral Spirituality published that year, he introduced the concept of "altitudes" as an overall "content-free" system to correlate developmental stages across all of the theories on all of the lines integrated by AQAL.

The altitudes used a set of colors that were ordered according to the rainbow, which Wilber explained was necessary to align with color energies in the tantric tradition. This left only Red, Orange, Green, and Turquoise in place, changing all of the other colors to greater or lesser degrees. Furthermore, where Spiral Dynamics theorizes that the 2nd tier would have six stages repeating the themes of the six stages of the 1st tier, in the altitude system the 2nd tier contains only two levels (corresponding to the first two SD 2nd tier levels) followed by a 3rd tier of four spiritually-oriented levels inspired by the work of Sri Aurobindo. Beck and Cowan each consider this 3rd tier to be non-Gravesian.

Wilber critic Frank Visser notes that while Wilber gives a correspondence of his altitude colors to chakras, his correspondence does not actually match any traditional system for coloring chakras, despite Wilber's assertion that using the wrong colors would "backfire badly when any actual energies were used."  He goes on to note that Wilber's criticism of the SD colors as "inadequate" ignores that they were not intended to correlate with any system such as chakras. In this context, Visser expresses sympathy for Beck and Cowan's dismay over what Visser describes as "vandalism" regarding the color scheme, concluding that the altitude colors are an "awkward hybrid" of the SD and rainbow/chakra color systems, both lacking the expressiveness of the former and failing to accurately correlate with the latter.

Criticism and limitations 
As an extension of Graves's theory, most criticisms of that theory apply to Spiral Dynamics as well. Likewise, to the extent that Spiral Dynamics Integral incorporates Ken Wilber's integral theory, criticism of that theory, and the lack of mainstream academic support for it are also relevant.

In addition, there have been criticisms of various aspects of SD and/or SDi that are specific to those extensions. Nicholas Reitter, writing in the Journal of Conscious Evolution, observes:

On the other hand, the SD authors seem also to have magnified some of the weaknesses in Graves' approach. The occasional messianism, unevenness of presentation and constant business-orientation of Graves' (2005) manuscript is transmuted in the SD authors' book (Beck and Cowan 1996) into a sometimes- bewildering array of references to world history, pop culture and other topics, often made in helter-skelter fashion.

Spiral Dynamics has been criticized by some as appearing to be like a cult, with undue prominence given to the business and intellectual property concerns of its leading advocates.

Metamodernist philosophers Daniel Görtz and Emil Friis, writing as Hanzi Freinacht, note that Spiral Dynamics provides unique insights, while also criticizing it for combining too many dimensions of development into one measurement. Their multi-part system combines aspects of SD with other developmental measurements, describing SD as the "awkward uncle" of their "Effective Value Meme" concept.  They also entirely dismiss the Turquoise level, saying that while there will eventually be another level, it does not currently exist. In support of this assertion, they note the lack of critique of metamodernism (which they roughly equate with the Yellow level), and explain those who self-identify as Turquoise as confusing level with their non-SD dimensions of development, state and depth. They also warn that attempts to build Turquoise communities are, in their view, likely to lead to the development of "abusive cults" as a result of trying to make the Turquoise level real when (in their view) it is not.

Psychologist Keith Rice, discussing his application of SDi in individual psychotherapy, notes that it encounters limitations in accounting for temperament and the unconscious. However, regarding SDi's "low profile among academics," he notes that it can easily be matched to more well-known models "such as Maslow, Loevinger, Kohlberg, Adorno, etc.," in order to establish trust with clients.

Influence and applications 
Spiral Dynamics has influenced management theory, which was the primary focus of the 1996 Spiral Dynamics book.  John Mackey and Rajendra Sisodia write that the vision and values of conscious capitalism as they articulate it are consistent with the "2nd tier" VMEMES of Spiral Dynamics.  Rica Viljoen's case study of economic development in Ghana demonstrates how understanding the Purple VMEME allows for organizational storytelling that connects with diverse (non-Western) worldviews.

Spiral Dynamics has also been noted as an example of applied memetics. In his chapter, "'Meme Wars': A Brief Overview of Memetics and Some Essential Context" in the peer-reviewed book Memetics and Evolutionary Economics, Michael P. Schlaile includes Spiral Dynamics in the "organizational memetics" section of his list of "enlightening examples of applied memetics."  Schlaile also notes Said Dawlabani's SDi-based "MEMEnomics" as an alternative to his own "economemetics" in his chapter examining memetics and economics in the same book.  Elza Maalouf argues that SDi provides a "memetic" interpretation of non-Western cultures that Western NGOs often lack, focusing attention on the "indigenous content" of the culture's value system.

Spiral Dynamics continues to influence integral philosophy and spirituality, and the developmental branch of metamodern philosophy. Both integralists and metamodernists connect their philosophies to SD's Yellow VMEME.  Integralism also identifies with Turquoise and eventually added further stages not found in SD or SDi, while metamodernism dismisses Turquoise as nonexistent.

SDi has also been referenced in the fields of education,
urban planning,
and cultural analysis.

Notes

References 

 
 
 
 
  (Note on page ii: "This study was approved by Indiana University Institutional Review Board (IRB)." Note also that a previous report was published as: Nasser, Ilham (June 2020). "Mapping the Terrain of Education 2018–2019: A Summary Report". Journal of Education in Muslim Societies. Indiana University Press. 1 (2): 3–21. doi:10.2979/jems.1.2.08, but is not freely downloadable.)
 
 
 

Stage theories
Developmental psychology